Nebraska Highway 9 is a highway in northeastern Nebraska.  The southern terminus is located just north of West Point at an intersection with U.S. Highway 275.  Its northern terminus is at an intersection with Nebraska Highway 12 just south of Ponca.

Route description
Nebraska Highway 9 heads due north into farmland from its intersection with U.S. Highway 275 while US 275 turns northwest just north of West Point, Nebraska.  After passing Nebraska Highway 51, it continues north and just before reaching Pender, meets and overlaps Nebraska Highway 16.  NE 16 separates just north of Pender, and the highway proceeds through the Omaha Indian Reservation and the Winnebago Indian Reservation.  It continues north through Emerson, meets Nebraska Highway 35, and turns west with NE 35.

North of Wakefield, NE 9 turns north again and goes through Allen before meeting with U.S. Highway 20.  It turns east for a mile with US 20, then turns north again.  It goes north through Martinsburg, then turns east and northeast to end just south of Ponca.

Major intersections

See also

 List of state highways in Nebraska

References

External links

 The Nebraska Highways Page: Highways 1 to 30
 Nebraska Roads: NE 1-10

009
Transportation in Cuming County, Nebraska
Transportation in Thurston County, Nebraska
Transportation in Dakota County, Nebraska
Transportation in Dixon County, Nebraska